Two Generations of Brubeck is a 1973 studio album by Dave Brubeck accompanied by his sons Darius, Chris and Dan.

Reception

The album was reviewed by Scott Yanow at Allmusic who wrote that the musicians "This very interesting set features the pianist with three of his sons...To hear such numbers as "Three to Get Ready," "Blue Rondo à la Turk" and "Unsquare Dance" (along with some newer pieces) performed by these younger players casts new light on the durability and flexibility of these classic Brubeck songs."

Track listing 
 "Circadian Dysrhythmia" - 3:24
 "Three to Get Ready" - 4:18
 "Blue Rondo à la Turk" - 7:58	
 "Unsquare Dance" - 2:47
 "The Holy One" - 3:38
 "Call of the Wild" (Perry Robinson) - 3:00
 "Knives" - 4:22
 "Tin Sink" (Darius Brubeck) - 8:32
 "Thank You (Dziekuje)" - 5:29

All compositions by Dave Brubeck, other composers indicated.

Personnel 
 Dave Brubeck - piano, electric piano
 Darius Brubeck - electric piano, piano, clavinet
 Jerry Bergonzi - soprano saxophone, tenor saxophone
 Chris Brubeck - electric bass, trombone
 Dan Brubeck - drums
 Randie Powell - percussion
 David Powell - double bass
 Perry Robinson - clarinet
 Peter "Madcat" Ruth - harmonica
 Michael Cuscuna - producer, liner notes
 Chick Corea - liner notes
 David Dutemple - electric bass
 Richie Morales - drums
 Stephan Dudash - violin
 Dave Mason - guitar
 Jimmy Cathcart - electric piano

References

1973 albums
Albums produced by Michael Cuscuna
Dave Brubeck albums
Atlantic Records albums